A ball-up (pl. ball-ups) in Australian rules football is the method by which the field umpire restarts play at a neutral contest after a stoppage within the field of play. It involves the throwing or bouncing of the ball up between two players, known as rucks, who then attempt to win possession for their teams.

A related type of contest, the boundary throw-in, occurs to restart play after the ball has gone out of bounds. It is governed by similar rules, although is not itself known as a ball-up.

Ball-ups have been part of the Laws of the Game since 1872. Ball-ups are the equivalent of a jump ball, faceoff or dropped-ball from other team sports.

Execution
There are two means of executing a ball-up: a throw or a bounce. For a throw, the field umpire throws the ball vertically upwards. For a bounce, the umpire throws the ball firmly on the ground such that it bounces several metres up into the air approximately, although not always perfectly, vertically.

In both cases, the ball is then contested by the teams' ruckmen, which is known as a ruck contest. Generally, the ruckmen try to jump and tap the ball down to one of the team's rovers. To that end, the height to which the ball is thrown or bounced needs to be at least above the outstretched arms of the teams' ruckmen; ruckmen may also try to take clean possession of the ball, or allow it to fall to ground and become a ground contest. The ruck is one of the most specialised positions in an Australian rules football team, and is usually one of the tallest players or players with the highest vertical leap on the team.

Under modern rules, in place since 2013, almost all ball-ups are executed by throw, with only the ball-ups in the centre of the ground at the start of each quarter and after each goal is scored executed by bounce – this type of ball-up known as a centre bounce. An umpire may also elect to throw instead of bounce if soft or wet ground conditions preclude bouncing; prior to 2013, soft ground condition was generally the only reason for throwing the ball, with the bounce standard at all ball-ups.

Rules
A centre bounce (or centre throw) is staged at the beginning of each quarter and after each goal. A general ball-up is staged after all other neutral stoppages in play, with the exception of after the ball goes out of bounds, which is restarted by a boundary throw-in. The rules governing a centre bounce differ from those of a general ball-up.

Ball-up

A ball-up may be contested by only one player (generally the ruckman) from each team, nominated by the players and confirmed by the umpires prior to throwing or bouncing the ball. There is no restriction on the positioning of other players around the contest, provided there is space for the umpire to execute the ball-up; this includes leaving a corridor immediately behind the umpire for him to retreat into. The two ruckmen must stand apart, and may not physically engage each other until the umpire has bounced or thrown the ball; but once the ball is in flight, they may engage in the ruck contest.

A free kick is awarded in a ruck contest if a player:
 Is the first to touch the ball in the air but is not one of the nominated ruckmen
 Touches or interferes with the ball before it reaches the apex of its trajectory
 Illegally pushes the opposing ruckman out of the contest
 Illegally blocks the opposing ruckman from the contest
 Rucks the ball out of bounds on the full

The rule requiring that only one ruckman from each team contest the ball was introduced in 2017. Prior to this, a common strategy was for one ruckman to block the other while a team-mate entered the ruck contest and won the tap-out, becoming what was known as a third man up.

The ball-up has been a feature of the Laws of the Game since 1872; prior to this, a scrimmage would be allowed to continue until the ball was won. Ball-ups were originally thrown, but bouncing had become common from as early as 1880; the rules formally changed to a mandate a bounce in 1887.

Boundary throw-ins

A boundary throw-in occurs to restart play after the ball goes out of bounds. The boundary umpire stands at the point where the ball went out of bounds, back turned the players, and flings the ball high and backwards over his head towards the ruck contest; the ball spins end-over-end. The same rules governing the ruck contest itself apply equally to a boundary throw-in as a ball-up. 

Boundary throw-ins were not always used in the sport's early history. Specialist boundary umpires were introduced in 1904, with the field umpire performing the restart before this. Originally the umpires punched ball back into play; in 1910, this was changed to a short backwards throw-in, extended to a long backwards throw in 1920, and was replaced with a ball-up near the boundary line in 1921. The modern boundary throw-in was re-introduced in 1931 and has persisted since then.

Centre bounce

The laws governing a centre bounce (or centre throw) are more prescriptive, and lead to a different style of contest. Several rules consider the markings on the ground:
The ball is bounced in the very centre of the ground
When the ball is bounced, each ruckman must be:
Outside the 3m centre circle
Inside the 10m centre circle
On the team's defensive side of the centre line
The team's other players have defined positions, with three inside the centre square (but outside the 10m circle), six in each 50m arc, and one on each wing
These restrictions apply only to the initial centre bounce, or a centre throw after a recalled centre bounce. An around-the-ground ball-up which happens to be at or near the centre of the ground is not subject to these restrictions.

These markings were introduced over time to manage a variety of issues. The centre square (originally a centre diamond) was introduced in 1973 to prevent congestion from having too many rovers around the centre bounce. The centre line was introduced in 1982 to prevent players from wrestling prior to the bounce. The 10m circle was introduced in 2005 to limit the length of the ruckmen's run-ups, as posterior cruciate ligament injuries caused by front-on knee clashes at centre bounces had become a common problem over the previous years. 

An umpire may recall an errant centre bounce which skews in such a way that it does not create a fair contest between the two ruckman, stopping play and re-setting the players to execute a second ball-up by throw. Rules allowing for errant or skewed bounces to be recalled were also introduced only in the 21st century, with bad bounces considered a variable of the game prior to this.

The centre bounce was introduced to the Laws of the Game in 1891. Prior to this, the ball was kicked off from the centre of the ground by the team who was scored upon (or, as determined by the coin toss at start of the game).

Challenges
The skill of being able to bounce an obloid shaped ball vertically upwards on a grass surface is unique to Australian rules football, and is much loved by traditionalists. However, it is very difficult to master, and is blamed for deterring aspiring umpires from pursuing the job, or hindering competent decision makers from reaching the top levels of umpiring. The bounce is also physically demanding on the back and hamstrings and is a major cause of field umpire injuries. These two effects are compounding, with physical demands limiting the amount of time umpires can spend perfecting the craft. These reasons have resulted in opinions that all bounces should be replaced with throws.

Long run-ups and front-on knee clashes during centre bounces became a common cause of posterior cruciate ligament injuries for ruckmen in the early years of the 21st century. In addition to introducing the 10m circle to limit run-up length, free kicks were introduced against ruckmen leading with their knees.

In the 1999 preseason, rubber pads were installed in the very centre of the AFL venues to give the umpires a reliable surface for centre bounces. These were quickly removed after  ruckman Shaun Rehn slipped on one and suffered a serious knee injury.

References

External links
Laws of Australian Football 2013

Australian rules football terminology